Sarakini is a village and a community in the municipal unit of Gortyna, western Arcadia, Greece. It is situated on a hill above the right bank of the river Alfeios, at about 450 m elevation. It is 2 km northwest of Vlachorraptis, 4 km northeast of Theisoa (Elis), 7 km northwest of Karytaina and 8 km southwest of Dimitsana. In 2011 Sarakini had a population of 8 for the village and 51 for the community, which includes the villages Kryonero and Palaiokastro.

History
The village of Sarakini is first recorded in 1665, and was built, according to tradition, by settlers from Constantinople. Palaiokastro is the site of a Mycenaean-era settlement (Homer's Phere), with a cemetery and a nekromanteion having been found. The ruins of a nearby medieval fortress have been identified with the Araklovon Castle. The village of Kryoneri is first mentioned in the Ottoman tax registers of 1698/1700, although its present site is more recent, as the village was moved from its original location.

Population

See also
List of settlements in Arcadia

References

External links
History and information about Sarakini
 Sarakini on the GTP Travel Pages

Gortyna, Arcadia
Populated places in Arcadia, Peloponnese